Firmanzah (7 July 1976 – 6 February 2021) was an Indonesian academic.

Career 
At the age of 32 years he became dean of the Faculty of Economics, University of Indonesia, for the period 2009–2013. Firmanzah was elected as dean on 14 April 2008, making him the youngest dean of the University of Indonesia ever. He published more than 20 journal articles and several books.

Firmanzah also advised the Digital Divide Institute's  "economic track" in which he explored the economic model for meaningful broadband for presentation to the Indonesian government.

In 2012, Firmanzah was appointed the special adviser for economic affairs to then-President Susilo Bambang Yudhoyono.

Selected books 
 Globalisasi: Sebuah Proses Dialektika Sistemi, Jakarta: Yayasan Bhakti Satria SAD, 2007, 
 Marketing Politik - Antara Pemahaman Dan Realitas, Jakarta: Yayasan Obor Indonesia, 2007, 
 Mengelola Partai Politik: Komunikasi Dan Positioning Ideologi Politik Di Era Demokrasi, Jakarta: Yayasan Obor Indonesia, 2008,

References

External links 
 Digital Divide Institute

1976 births
2021 deaths
Indonesian economists
Academic staff of the University of Indonesia
University of Indonesia alumni
People from Surabaya